Die Harald Schmidt Show ("The Harald Schmidt Show") was a German late-night talk show hosted on Sky Deutschland by comedian Harald Schmidt. The show first aired from 5 December 1995 to 23 December 2003 on Sat.1. Schmidt then moved his show to Das Erste as Harald Schmidt and Schmidt & Pocher, but he returned to Sat.1 on 13 September 2011. After cancellation on Sat.1, the show continued on Sky Deutschland in September 2012. Schmidt retired from television in 2014.

Writers 
 Peter Rütten
 Manuel Andrack
 Suzana Novinščak
 Nathalie Licard
 Ralf Kabelka
 Katrin Bauerfeind

Music 
The house band is led by Helmut Zerlett
 Helmut Zerlett – keyboards
 Axel Heilhecker - guitars
 Rosko Gee - bass
 Antoine Fillon - drums
 Jürgen Dahmen - piano
 Thomas Heberer - trumpets
 Mel Collins - saxophone

History 
The first incarnation of the show aired from 5 December 1995 in the Tuesday-Saturday 11:15 pm time slot. The shows from Tuesday to Friday were live on tape, and the Saturday shows were live. Over time, the Saturday shows were phased out. From 30 June 2003 until the end of its first run on 23 December 2003, it also aired Monday shows.

Schmidt then moved to Das Erste with his band leader Helmut Zerlett, but without his sidekick Manuel Andrack. Schmidt moved back to Sat.1 beginning from 13 September 2011, hosting two shows a week every Tuesday and Wednesday at 11:15 pm. Sat.1 canceled the show after one season due to low viewer levels. Since 4 September 2012 new episodes are shown on Sky Hits HD and Sky Atlantic HD, two channels of the German Pay-TV network Sky Deutschland.

The format of the show is similar to American late night talk shows, with a monologue in the beginning, followed by comedy skits, interviews, and a musical guest.

Polish joke controversy

Schmidt was criticized for multiple usage of Polish jokes in his show. In his interview, Schmidt stated that he was surprised with the reaction. He mentioned that nobody makes much fuss about jokes involving Japanese or Germans. However, when he became aware of the reception, he stopped using these kinds of jokes.

Awards

List of episodes in  2011 (abridgement)

References

External links 
 Official site

German television talk shows
German satirical television shows
Anti-Polish sentiment in Europe
Sat.1 original programming
1995 German television series debuts
2000s German television series
2010s German television series
Television shows set in Cologne
German-language television shows